Asbecesta verticalis is a species of leaf beetle from the family Chrysomelidae. The species was first scientifically described in 1937 by Laboissiere. It is found in Africa, including Benin.

References

Galerucinae
Beetles described in 1937
Beetles of Africa